Melchior Römer  (16 June 1831, in Zürich – 2 April 1895) was a Swiss politician, mayor of Zürich (1867–1889) and President of the Swiss National Council (1878/79).

External links 

 
 

1831 births
1895 deaths
Politicians from Zürich
Swiss Calvinist and Reformed Christians
Free Democratic Party of Switzerland politicians
Members of the National Council (Switzerland)
Presidents of the National Council (Switzerland)
Mayors of Zürich